Nokia Browser for Symbian (formerly known as Web Browser for S60) was the default web browser for the S60 and Symbian mobile phone platform. The browser is based on a port of Apple Inc.'s open-source WebCore and JavaScriptCore frameworks which form the WebKit rendering engine that Apple uses in its Safari Web browser.

History
The first version in 2002 was lacking support for the Wireless Application Protocol (WAP) and Wireless Markup Language (WML) and Adobe Flash Lite. s60 version 2 introduced support for WAP and WML. Hence the Nokia Services (WAP) browser was the default browser on initial device shipments of this platform.

Nokia announced porting WebKit to the S60 Browser in June 2005, and made it available in November. At the 2006 World Wide Web Conference, Nokia announced that it was releasing the source code for its port of WebKit back to the community.

Browser 
It supports:
 HTML
 WAP 2.0 (XHTML)
 Cookies and JavaScript
 Wide web pages can be formatted for mobile viewing
 Multi-file download
 Super web browsing
Drawbacks:
 Multi-window browsing is not supported.
 It does not compress pages, which puts a greater strain on the phone's processor and bandwidth usage.

S60v3 Browser (1 April 2006)
It supports:
 HTML
 WAP 2.0 (XHTML)
 Cookies and Adobe Flash Lite
 Multi-window browsing
 Many files (up to 10) can be downloaded at once. This s60 v3 was the first version to support Adobe Flash Lite.

Nokia Browser 7.0
Nokia Browser 7.0 is supported on S60 5th Edition devices.

This version supports all of the features of prior to the Nokia Browser 7 releases, as well as the following additional features:
 Support for touch devices
 On-screen zoom controls

Nokia Browser 7.1
Nokia Browser 7.1 is supported on S60 3rd and 5th Edition devices.

New features:
 Based on WebKit 525
 Full support for Flash Lite 3.0
 Supports kinetic scrolling
 User-configurable shortcut keys and visual keymap
 Full-screen view

Drawbacks:
 Copy paste support is poor. If you have a device with no Control-key or Pen-key, you can not copy paste in most web forms. With older Nokia models, like N95 or E90, this was not a problem, as N95 had a Pen-key and E90 had a Control-key. New N86 and N97 do not have such keys. However, E72, which was released in 11/2009, has a Control-key.
 Some jQuery effects are not supported (fadeIn and slideDown)

Nokia Browser 7.2 (Symbian^3) 
The Nokia Browser 7.2 is supported on Symbian^3 and S60 (3rd and 5th Edition) platform devices.

New features:

 Support for Capacitive touch display
 Two finger touch support (pinch open and pinch close) - on capacitive touch devices only
 Support for Optical Finger Navigation
 Flash Lite 4.0 - On Symbian 3 devices only
 Flash Lite 3.1 - On Symbian 3, S60 5th Edition, and S60 3rd Edition (Feature Pack 2) devices
 Search Client Integration

Nokia Browser 7.3 (Symbian Anna) 
Nokia Browser 7.3 is pre-installed on Symbian Anna devices (like the Nokia E6 and Nokia X7). Browser 7.3 is also available to Symbian^3 devices (Nokia C6-01, Nokia C7, Nokia E7, Nokia N8) as part of the upgrade from Symbian^3 to Symbian Anna. Some S60 3rd Edition and S60 5th Edition devices received the updated browser in the form of firmware updates. This version brings a touch-optimized user interface in addition to better web standards support and improved performance.

New features include:
 Basic HTML5 support
 CSS 3 support
 JavaScript 1.8 support 
 Viewport meta tag support
 Internationalized Domain Name (IDN) support 
 Flash Lite 4.0.3 support
 VGA screen support
 Multi-window browsing
 touch-optimized user interface:
 Split-screen virtual keyboard support for live update of input fields
 Easy to access address bar at the top of the page with improved auto-complete
 Back button is always accessible
 Full screen and quick menu access button

Nokia Browser 7.4 (Nokia Belle) 
Nokia Browser 7.4 is pre-installed on Nokia Belle devices (Nokia 600, Nokia 603, Nokia 700, Nokia 701). Browser 7.4 is also available to 
Symbian^3/Anna devices as part of the upgrade from Symbian Anna to Nokia Belle.

Browser 7.4 added support for the following features:
 HTML5 Audio/Video APIs and UI
 HTML5 Geolocation APIs and UI
 URL hash tag navigation (back/forward) within a web page without page reloads

Additionally, the user interface is changed in comparison to v7.3 as follows:
 Previous/next page, Bookmarks, Multi-window navigation, menu buttons at the bottom 
 Direct access to RSS web feeds from the menu
 Links can be shared via SMS, e-mail, or Bluetooth

Nokia Browser 8.3 (Nokia Belle) 
Come with Nokia Belle FP2 (Nokia 603, Nokia 700, Nokia 701, Nokia 808)
Better HTML5 and JavaScript support
Contains a bug (v8.3.2.21) where selecting "clear privacy data -> all" doesn't actually clear cookies; they must be cleared specifically.

See also
 Mobile browser
 Information appliance
 User agent
 Nokia Xpress

References

External links 

Nokia Browsers
 Nokia Browser
 Nokia Developer - Symbian Browsers
 S60WebKit (Rendering engine)
 Nokia Developer - S60WebKit
 Webkit - Trac - S60WebKit Project

Nokia services
S60 (software platform)
Symbian software
S60
Software based on WebKit